Nipon may refer to:

People 

 Albert Nipon
 Nipon Goswami
 Nipon Malanont
 Nipon Pensuvapap
 Nipon Charn-arwut

See also 

 Nippon, Japanese for Japan
 Nippon Club (Manhattan) 
 Nihon Ōdai Ichiran, table of the rulers of Japan
 Nippon (disambiguation)